The African Junior Chess Championship is an annual chess tournament open to players in Africa who are under 20 years of age. The tournament was first held in 1980, and since its second edition in 1989, has been held annually with the exception of 2010. Beginning in 2002, a separate championship for girls has been held concurrently with the open championship.

Competition
The championships are organized by national federations affiliated with the African Chess Confederation. They are open to chess players who are under 20 years of age as of 1 January of the year in which the championship is held. The championships are organized as a round-robin or a Swiss-system tournament depending on the number of participants. Since 2001, the open championship has been a nine-round Swiss.

The winners of the open and girls' championships earn the right to participate in the next year's World Junior Chess Championships. In the open championship, the top three players after tiebreaks all earn the International Master title, while the first-placed player additionally earns a norm towards the Grandmaster title. In the girls' championship, the top three players after tiebreaks all earn the Woman International Master title, while the first-placed player additionally earns a norm towards the Woman Grandmaster title.

Results

Open championship

Results are taken from Olimpbase unless otherwise indicated.

Girls' championship

Results are taken from Olimpbase unless otherwise indicated.

See also
Pan American Junior Chess Championship
Asian Junior Chess Championship
European Junior Chess Championship
European Youth Chess Championship

References

Supranational chess championships
1980 in chess
Recurring sporting events established in 1980
Women's chess competitions
2002 in chess
Recurring sporting events established in 2002
Chess in Africa
African championships
Under-20 sports competitions